James, Jim, or Jimmy Quinn may refer to:

Sportspeople
James Quinn (athlete) (1906–2004), gold medal-winning American athlete at the 1928 Summer Olympics
James Quinn (footballer, born 1974), ex-Blackpool F.C. and Northern Irish international footballer
Bob Quinn (baseball, born 1870) (James Aloysius Robert Quinn, 1870–1954), American executive in Major League Baseball
Jim Quinn (Australian footballer) (1904–1986), Australian footballer for Essendon
Jimmy Quinn (footballer, born 1878) (1878–1945), Celtic and Scotland centre-forward
Jimmy Quinn (footballer, born 1947) (1947–2002), Scottish footballer, grandson of the footballer born 1878
Jimmy Quinn (footballer, born 1959), Northern Ireland international footballer
Jimmy Quinn (jockey) (born 1967), Irish jockey

Other
James Quinn (bishop) (1819–1881), the first Roman Catholic Archbishop of Brisbane
James Quinn (director), American film and television director
James Quinn (film administrator) (1919–2008), British film administrator, producer and exhibitor
James Quinn (Jesuit) (1919–2010), Scottish priest and hymn writer
James Aiden O'Brien Quinn, Irish-born lawyer and expatriate judge
James Brian Quinn (1928–2012), American academic and author
James H. Quinn (1857–1930), American jurist
James J. Quinn (Irish Army officer) (1918–1982), general in Irish Army and United Nations
James L. Quinn (editor), American science fiction editor and publisher
James L. Quinn (politician) (1875–1960), U.S. Representative from Pennsylvania
James O'Donnell Quinn (1906–?), politician in British Columbia, Canada
James Peter Quinn (1869–1951), Australian World War I war artist
James Quinn, maker of the documentary Nazi Pop Twins
James Quinn (actor), actor in British sitcom Early Doors
Jim Quinn (born 1943), American radio talk show host
Jim Quinn (New Brunswick politician), Canadian Senator
Jim Quinn, one of two Irish boys who discovered the Ardagh Hoard in 1868

See also 
Alexander James Quinn (1932–2013), bishop of the Catholic Church in the United States
James Quin (1693–1766), English actor of Irish descent